Thomas Llewelyn Webb is a professor of psychology at the University of Sheffield in the UK. He is a social psychologist whose interests include motivation, goal orientation, and emotional self-regulation. His research has shown that making backup plans can reduce the likelihood of risky behavior.

Education 
Webb has a BA in psychology from the University of Sheffield, an MSc in Research Methods for Psychology from the University of Bristol, and a PhD from the University of Sheffield. His PhD dissertation, titled Motivational and volitional aspects of self-regulation, was awarded the British Psychological Society Social Section prize for outstanding PhD thesis (2004).

References

External links
 

Living people
English psychologists
Social psychologists
Academics of the University of Sheffield
1978 births